The  was an underground silver mine in the city of Ōda, in Shimane Prefecture on the main island of Honshu, Japan. It was the largest silver mine in Japanese history. It was active for almost four hundred years, from its discovery in 1526 to its closing in 1923.

The mines, mining structures, and surrounding cultural landscape — listed as the "Iwami Ginzan Silver Mine and its Cultural Landscape" — became a UNESCO World Heritage Site in 2007.

History

The mine was discovered and developed in 1526 by Kamiya Jutei, a Japanese merchant. Jutei later introduced a Korean style of silver mining that would become the Haifukiho Method. The mine reached its peak production in the early 1600s, with approximately 38 tons of silver a year while Japan produced about 200 tons of silver a year which was then one third of the world's production.

Silver from the mine was used widely for coins in Japan. It was contested fiercely by warlords until the Tokugawa Shogunate won control of it in 1600 as a result of the Battle of Sekigahara in 1600. It was later secured by fences and barricaded by pine trees. Yamabuki Castle was built in the center of the mining complex.

Silver production from the mine fell in the 19th century, as it had trouble competing with mines elsewhere in the world. Mining for other minerals, such as copper, then replaced silver as the predominant material produced from the mountain. The mine was eventually closed in 1923.

Economic influences
Iwami Ginzan Silver Mine played a pivotal role in East Asian trade, where silver was a key currency. In Europe and China, the mine had been known as the largest silver mine that could compare to the renowned Spanish colonial Cerro Rico mine of Potosí in the Viceroyalty of Peru, a present-day World Heritage Site in Bolivia.

In foreign countries, because the silver mined at Iwami Ginzan was of very high quality, it came to be known as one of the Japanese brands of silver, sold as "Soma Silver". The name derived from the village of Sama (Soma) in which the mine was located. This silver was given the highest trading credit in East Asia. From the 17th century on, the silver coins made from the mine's silver were traded as not only one of the basic currencies within Japan, but also as the currency for trade with China, Portugal, and the Netherlands. (Japan began trading with Portugal in late 16th century, and the Netherlands in the 17th century)

The prosperity of the mine can be known by its indication on the maps of the period as the "Silver Mine Kingdom". With the progress of navigation, the monarchs of Western Europe had gained many maps imported from Muslim civilizations, and then developed their own maps. A trading fleet using the maps sailed via India and China to Japan, to trade European goods for Japanese silver. The feudal lords who controlled the mine actively traded with the Europeans.

World Heritage Site

Parts of the mining town remain in good condition and the Japanese Government designated it as a Special Preservation District for Groups of Historic Buildings in 1969. The government also applied for it to become a World Heritage Site. An evaluation of the site by the International Council on Monuments and Sites (ICOSMOS)) found no "outstanding universal value. Nevertheless, the evaluating body concluded in its report that Iwami Ginzan was "a strong candidate for inscription as a World Heritage property" in the future. It recommended that the nomination be deferred for the time being so that more research on the property could be conducted.

The bid was finally successful in 2007, establishing the Iwami Ginzan Silver Mine and its Cultural Landscape as a listed World Heritage Site.

The development of a large silver mine usually requires substantial quantities of lumber to be harvested from surrounding forests. However, the development of Iwami Ginzan Silver Mine resulted in less deforestation and erosion because of "sustainable" control of logging, and also less soil and water pollution. It was one of the reasons that Iwami Ginzan Silver Mine was selected as a World Heritage Site. It was also declared in 2007 as among the 100 greatest geological sites of Japan.

Features

The World Heritage Site includes:
 Iwami Ginzan's mining area of around six hundred pits and mine shafts
 Related processing, administrative, residential, and religious sites
 Three historic castles built in the 16th century to protect the mines
 Three service ports for shipping silver
 Connecting transportation routes

Components

The fourteen nominated components assessed by ICOMOS are:

 the mining area of 
 the Daikansho site
 
 
 
 the mining settlement of 
 the silver refining facilities of 
 the 
 the temple 
 Iwami Ginzan Kaidō Tomogauradō transportation route
 Iwami Ginzan Kaidō Yunotsu-Okidomaridō transportation route
  service port/port town
  service port/port town
  service port/port town

Museums 

 Iwami Ginzan World Heritage Center
 Iwami Silver Mine Museum

See also 
 Cultural landscape
 Cultural Landscape (Japan)
 List of World Heritage Sites in Japan
 Mining in Japan

References

Bibliography
 Lyman, Benjamin Smith. (1879).  Geological Survey of Japan: Reports of Progress for 1878 and 1879. Tookei: Public Works Department.   OCLC: 13342563
 https://web.archive.org/web/20130627011241/http://sinn.dip.jp/kesiki/simane/iwamiginnzann1.htm

External links

  UNESCO.org: Iwami Ginzan Silver Mine and its Cultural Landscape
 Ginzan.city.ja: Iwami-Ginzan Silver Mine website
 Japan Mint.jp: World Heritage Coin Set
 Hannah Grace's Iwami Ginzan Travel Journal: Iwami-Ginzan Silver Mine website

Silver mines in Japan
Buildings and structures in Shimane Prefecture
Cultural Landscapes of Japan
History of Shimane Prefecture
Historic Sites of Japan
1526 establishments in Japan
1923 disestablishments in Japan
Tourist attractions in Shimane Prefecture
World Heritage Sites in Japan